The 1974 United States Senate election in Connecticut took place on November 5, 1974. Incumbent Democratic U.S. Senator Abraham Ribicoff was re-elected to a third term in office over Republican James H. Brannen III.

General election

Results

See also 
 1974 United States Senate elections

References 

1974 Connecticut elections
1974
Connecticut